The men's 400 metre freestyle event at the 1980 Summer Olympics was held on 24 July at the Swimming Pool at the Olimpiysky Sports Complex.

Records
Prior to this competition, the existing world and Olympic records were as follows.

The following records were established during the competition:

Results

Heats

Final

References

F
Men's events at the 1980 Summer Olympics